Alfredo Copello (born 15 March 1903, date of death unknown) was an Argentine lightweight professional boxer who competed in the 1920s. He won a silver medal in Boxing at the 1924 Summer Olympics, having lost to the Danish Hans Jacob Nielsen in the final bout.

References

External links
databaseOlympics

1903 births
Boxers at the 1924 Summer Olympics
Lightweight boxers
Olympic boxers of Argentina
Olympic silver medalists for Argentina
Year of death missing
Place of birth missing
Olympic medalists in boxing
Argentine male boxers
Medalists at the 1924 Summer Olympics